Kurone Mishima (三嶋 くろね) is a Japanese illustrator from Saitama Prefecture. She is best known as the illustrator of the KonoSuba and Akashic Records of Bastard Magic Instructor light novels.

Works

Light novels
KonoSuba
Mangetsu no Jinrou to Hangetsu no Vampire
Next Haven
Ore no Real to Netoge ga Love Comedy ni Shinshokusare Hajimete Yabai
Ore to Kanojo no Battle wa Living de
Akashic Records of Bastard Magic Instructor

Manga
4-koma Koushiki Anthology: Toaru Kagaku no Railgun x Toaru Majutsu no Index
Choujigen Game Neptune: The Animation - Dengeki Comic Anthology
Hataraku Maou-sama! High School!

References

External links 
 Kurone Mishima at anime-expo.org

Living people
Manga artists
Year of birth missing (living people)
People from Saitama (city)